Noche de estrellas literally "night of stars" in Spanish language may refer to:

Songs
"Noche de estrellas", 2012 single by Jose de Rico & Henry Mendez featuring Jay Santos
"Noche de estrellas", a track by rapper Benzino from his album Arch Nemesis
"Noche de estrellas", a track by Yaga & Mackie on their album Clase Aparte
"Noche de estrellas", a song by Malando appearing in Vol. 7 of series of compilation albums titled Superior Dancing

Television and variety
Noche de estrellas, a Latin American musical variety television show series
Noche de estrellas de Fidelity, a famous series of musical events by WFID, Radio Fidelity